Robert "Bob" L. Ulrich (born September 18th, 1933) is an American attorney and former mayor of St. Petersburg, Florida. He was elected in 1987.

Personal life

A former pilot in the US Air Force, Ulrich continues to practice law. He is married to Barbara Ann Woodworth and has four adult children.

References

Living people
1933 births
Mayors of St. Petersburg, Florida
Florida lawyers
Florida Republicans